The India national cricket team toured New Zealand from 22 January to 27 February 1990 and played a three-match Test series against New Zealand. New Zealand won the series 1–0.

Test Matches

1st Test

2nd Test

3rd Test

References

External links
 Tour home at ESPNCricinfo

1990 in Indian cricket
1990 in New Zealand cricket
1989-90
International cricket competitions from 1988–89 to 1991
New Zealand cricket seasons from 1970–71 to 1999–2000